Bellamya trochlearis is a species of large freshwater snail with a gill and an operculum, an aquatic gastropod mollusc in the family Viviparidae.

It was listed as Endangered species in 1996 IUCN Red list. It may be threatened by pollution, sedimentation and other human activities. Very little is known about this snail and it may be confused with Bellamya constricta.

Distribution
This species is found in Kenya, Tanzania, and Uganda.

References

Viviparidae
Taxa named by Eduard von Martens
Taxonomy articles created by Polbot